Jonny Zero is an American television action-crime drama series, created and written by R. Scott Gemmill and executive produced by John Wells, that premiered on Fox on January 14, 2005. The series principally stars Franky G as Jonny Calvo, an ex-con approached to be an FBI informant following his imprisonment for murder. The series co-stars GQ and Brennan Hesser.

A single season of thirteen episodes were produced, but Fox aired only eight of the thirteen episodes, choosing to cancel the series due to low ratings after initially choosing to broadcast it in the Friday night death slot. During the show's run, episodes were aired out of order, causing numerous continuity errors, including Jonny's best friend being murdered, but then turning up two episodes later alive and well, introduced as a new character. The series was broadcast in its entirety in Australia on ABC in 2007.

Plot
Jonny Calvo (Franky G) served four years in Sing-Sing Prison for killing a man. After release, he is determined to stay out of the criminal life; however his old boss, Garrett (Ritchie Coster), tries to lure him back to crime. FBI Agent Stringer (Chris Bauer) wants Jonny to be his informant so he can arrest Garrett on numerous criminal charges. Upon his release from prison, Jonny tries to prove to his ex-wife and son that he is reliable, but his past catches up with him, causing him to have minimal contact with them. His parole officer, Gloria (Aunjanue Ellis), orders Jonny to find a job upon his release and soon Jonny ends up mopping floors at Captain Jack's, a pirate-themed restaurant for children. He soon meets another employee who calls himself, Random (GQ).

The two soon become friends and Jonny decides that he will use his street smarts to help other people in need by starting his own private eye business. Random follows suit and allows Jonny to stay at his apartment. However, being a small private business, the money from clients is minimal and Jonny reluctantly decides to work for Garrett again, but making sure that crime will play no part in getting him thrown back in prison. Jonny is soon sought after by a father looking for his daughter, Danni a.k.a. "Velvet" (Brennan Hesser) who works at strip joints and goth clubs. After much complications, she stops working at clubs and forms a friendship with Jonny and Random. The series concentrates on Jonny trying to redeem himself by helping other people in need, staying away from crime and proving to his ex-wife and son that he has changed.

Cast

Main
 Franky G as Jonny Calvo
 GQ as Random
 Brennan Hesser as Danielle Stiles

Recurring
 Sean Moran as Vincent Calvo
 Ritchie Coster as Garrett
 Anthony Desio as Tull
 Samuel E. Wright as Jericho
 Chris Bauer as Agent Stringer
 Tawny Cypress as Nina Calvo
 Aunjanue Ellis as Gloria
 Susan Misner as Eve
 R.E. Rodgers as Niko
 Duke Valenti as Todd

Episodes
Episodes are listed in original production order.

References

External links
 

American action television series
2000s American crime drama television series
Fox Broadcasting Company original programming
Television shows set in the United States
English-language television shows
2005 American television series debuts
2005 American television series endings